

The Latécoère 290 was a torpedo bomber floatplane produced in France during the 1930s. Designed by Latécoère in response to an Aéronavale specification for such an aircraft, the 290 was based on its successful Laté 28.3 mail plane. It was a conventional high-wing, strut-braced monoplane that carried a single torpedo externally under the fuselage.

It was tested first with undercarriage installed and then on its intended floats; following which a batch of 20 was ordered by the navy, followed by an order for 10 more. These entered service in 1934, equipping two torpedo squadrons. All were relegated to training duties in early 1939, but four were returned to active service for coastal anti-submarine duties at the outbreak of the Second World War.

Variants
 Latécoère 290 - main production version with Hispano-Suiza 12Nbr engine (2 prototypes, plus 30 production machines)
 Latécoère 293 - version with Gnome-Rhône 14Kers engine (1 built)
 Latécoère 294 - version with Gnome-Rhône 14Kdrs and revised forward fuselage and fin (1 built)
 Latécoère 296 - similar to 294 but with Hispano-Suiza 12Ydrs engine (1 built)

Operators
 
 Aéronavale
 Escadrille 1S2 (Cherbourg, 1939)
 Escadrille 1T1 (Cherbourg, 1935)
 Escadrille 4T1 (Berre, 1934)

Specifications

See also

References

 
 
 aviafrance.com
 Уголок неба

1930s French bomber aircraft
Floatplanes
2
High-wing aircraft
Single-engined tractor aircraft
Aircraft first flown in 1931